Warpig is the only album by Canadian hard rock band Warpig.  It was released in 1970 on the local indie label Fonthill Records. In 1973, the album was re-released by London; it was also re-released in 2006 via Relapse and then Kreation Records in 2009.

Track listing
All songs were written by Warpig.
Side one
Flaggit3:09
Tough Nuts2:18
Melody with Balls6:02
Advance AM7:30
Side two
Rock Star4:11
Sunflight4:30
U.X.I.B.7:39
The Moth5:08

Personnel
Musicians
Rick Donmoyerelectric and acoustic guitars, lead vocals
Dana Snitchkeyboards, backing vocals
Terry Brettbass guitar
Terry Hookdrums, percussion

Production
ProducerRobert Irving
Recording, engineering & mixingKen Fresian
MasteringPeter J. Moore

References

1970 debut albums
Warpig (band) albums
London Records albums
Relapse Records albums